The 2024 United States presidential election in North Carolina is scheduled to take place on Tuesday, November 5, 2024, as part of the 2024 United States elections in which all 50 states plus the District of Columbia will participate. North Carolina voters will choose electors to represent them in the Electoral College via a popular vote. The state of North Carolina has 16 electoral votes in the Electoral College, following reapportionment due to the 2020 United States census in which the state gained a seat. North Carolina is considered to be a crucial swing state in 2024.

Incumbent Democratic president Joe Biden has stated that he intends to run for reelection to a second term.

Primary elections

Republican primary

The North Carolina Republican primary is scheduled to be held on Super Tuesday, March 5, 2024.

General election

Polling
Donald Trump vs. Joe Biden

Ron DeSantis vs. Joe Biden

See also 
 United States presidential elections in North Carolina
 2024 United States presidential election
 2024 Democratic Party presidential primaries
 2024 Republican Party presidential primaries
 2024 United States elections

Notes

Partisan clients

References 

North Carolina
2024
Presidential